
Wägitalersee is an artificial lake in Wägital, a valley in the canton of Schwyz, Switzerland. The lake is surrounded by the mountains Gross Aubrig, Fluebrig, Zindlenspitz, Brünnelistock and Bockmattli. The reservoir is located in the municipality of Innerthal.

The old village of Innerthal was flooded in 1924 when the dam Schräh was constructed. A new village was built on the current lake.

Economy
The primary economical purpose of the Wägitalersee is to serve as reservoir for pumped-storage hydroelectricity. The power plant and the reservoir dam became operational in 1924, thereby creating the Wägitalersee. The power plant is operated by NOK Wägital / AG Kraftwerk Wägital and produces approximately 120 million kWh of energy per year.

Besides the above industrial purpose, the lake is very popular as a (nearby) recreational area for families, hikers, nature lovers and especially fishermen. The waterside is easily accessible on foot and also by car (in certain areas).

See also
List of lakes of Switzerland
List of mountain lakes of Switzerland

References

External links
 Powerplant Operator: NOK Wägital / AG Kraftwerk Wägital
 Wägitalersee fishing and boat rental homepage

Lakes of the canton of Schwyz
Reservoirs in Switzerland
LWagitalersee